Neosho Township is a township in Cherokee County, Kansas, USA.  As of the 2000 census, its population was 306.

Geography
According to the USGS, it contains two cemeteries: Fairview and Fly Creek.

Big Candy Lake, Boone Lake, Hines Lake, Hubbell Lake, Little Candy Lake and Marvin Lake are within this township. The streams of Center Creek, Cherry Creek, Little Fly Creek and Short Creek run through this township. The Neosho River runs through this township.

References
 USGS Geographic Names Information System (GNIS)

External links
 City-Data.com

Townships in Cherokee County, Kansas
Townships in Kansas